Dámaso Marte Saviñón (born February 14, 1975) is a Dominican former professional baseball relief pitcher. He played for the Seattle Mariners, Pittsburgh Pirates (–),  Chicago White Sox (–), and New York Yankees (–).

Professional career

Seattle Mariners
He made his major league debut on June 30, 1999 during a 14–5 loss against the Oakland Athletics, allowing three earned runs in an inning of work.

Pittsburgh Pirates
On November 16, Marte signed with the New York Yankees, but was traded to the Pittsburgh Pirates on June 13, 2001, for Enrique Wilson. In his Pirates debut, he hurled three innings of one-hit ball against the Montreal Expos. He went on to throw 14 innings in which he only allowed one run and struck out a career-high five batters against the Cincinnati Reds.

Chicago White Sox
On March 27, 2002, Marte along with Edwin Yan were traded to the Chicago White Sox for Matt Guerrier. In , he enjoyed his most successful big league season, where he went 4–2 with a 1.58 ERA in 79.7 innings pitched where he struck out a career high 87 batters. He continued his success in  when he held opposing batters to a .217 batting average and left-handed batters to an average of .143. He also matched his career high for strikeouts in a game with 5 against the Florida Marlins.

A notable achievement for him was being the winning pitcher in the longest game in World Series history, Game 3 of the 2005 World Series. In that game, he tossed 1.2 scoreless innings and struck out three batters in the 14 inning win over the Houston Astros. The White Sox would then win the World Series against the Astros in 4 games.

Second stint with Pirates
On December 8, 2005, the White Sox traded Marte back to the Pittsburgh Pirates in exchange for Rob Mackowiak. Marte made three relief appearances in the World Baseball Classic for the Dominican Republic in 2006. Come the regular season, he went on to struggle a bit in where he lost seven straight games as a reliever but still averaged 9.7 strikeouts per nine innings pitched. In , he enjoyed some success where he held left-handed batters to a .094 batting average. He also did not allow a hit in 32 consecutive at-bats against left-handers which happened to be the longest streak of consecutive hitless at-bats by a left-handed batter against any pitcher in the MLB. For a stint, after an injury to Matt Capps, Marte was the Pirates closing pitcher, and was fairly successful. During his stint as closer, he was traded to the New York Yankees.

New York Yankees
On July 26, 2008, Marte and Xavier Nady were traded to the Yankees in exchange for José Tábata, Ross Ohlendorf, Jeff Karstens, and Daniel McCutchen. In his Yankees debut, he relieved José Veras (for only one batter), and faced David Ortiz, who struck out swinging.

Following the 2008 season, the Yankees declined Marte's option. However, the Yankees then re-signed him to a new three-year deal with an option for a fourth.

Following a disappointing regular season in which Marté posted an ERA of 9.45, he delivered an extraordinary performance for the Yankees in the playoffs.  After a shaky first outing in Game 2 of the 2009 American League Division Series, in which he surrendered two consecutive singles to the Minnesota Twins before being relieved, Marte retired all twelve of the remaining batters he faced during the postseason.  During Game 6 of the 2009 World Series, Marte faced Philadelphia Phillies stars Chase Utley and Ryan Howard, striking out both of them on the minimum six pitches. Marte and the Yankees went on to win Game 6, clinching the Series for the team's 27th championship.

Marte missed much of the 2010 season due to left arm inflammation. He underwent left shoulder surgery late in the 2010 season and was knocked out for the entire 2011 season. In late June, Marte started to play catch in his journey to recovery. He became a free agent at the end of the 2011 season after the Yankees declined his 2012 option and paid him a $250,000 buyout.

Children's Foundation
Marte supports a children's foundation in his name.

References

External links

1975 births
Living people
Arizona League Mariners players
Charlotte Knights players
Chicago White Sox players
Dominican Republic expatriate baseball players in the United States
Everett AquaSox players
Lancaster JetHawks players
Gulf Coast Yankees players

Major League Baseball pitchers
Major League Baseball players from the Dominican Republic
Nashville Sounds players
New Haven Ravens players
New York Yankees players
Norwich Navigators players
Orlando Rays players
Pittsburgh Pirates players
Scranton/Wilkes-Barre Yankees players
Seattle Mariners players
Sportspeople from Santo Domingo
Tacoma Rainiers players
Wisconsin Timber Rattlers players
World Baseball Classic players of the Dominican Republic
2006 World Baseball Classic players
2009 World Baseball Classic players